Frank Lewis may refer to:

Frank Lewis (American football) (born 1947), American NFL wide receiver
Frank Lewis (baseball), American baseball player
Frank Lewis (broadcaster) (born 1939), Canadian broadcaster and lieutenant governor of Prince Edward Island
Frank Lewis (cricketer) (born 1933), Jamaican cricketer
Frank Lewis (wrestler) (1912–1998), American Olympic wrestler
Frank Beckett Lewis, English architect
Frank L. Lewis, American electrical engineer, academic and researcher
Frank W. Lewis (1912–2010), American cryptographer and crossword compiler
 Frank Harlan Lewis (1919–2008), American botanist

See also

Francis Lewis (disambiguation)